Jozef Rejdovian (born 18 March 1991) is a Slovak footballer who plays for Austrian club SC Kittsee.

References

External links
FK Dukla profile 

1991 births
Living people
Slovak footballers
Slovak expatriate footballers
FK Dukla Banská Bystrica players
FC ViOn Zlaté Moravce players
FK Pohronie players
SC-ESV Parndorf 1919 players
Slovak Super Liga players
2. Liga (Slovakia) players
Austrian Regionalliga players
Austrian Landesliga players
Association football midfielders
Slovak expatriate sportspeople in Austria
Expatriate footballers in Austria
Sportspeople from Brezno